Podvranić is a village in Bosnia and Herzegovina. According to the 1991 census, the village is located in the municipality of Široki Brijeg. With 100% of the population being Croats.

Demographics 
According to the 2013 census, its population was 150, all Croats.

References

Populated places in Široki Brijeg